Claude Monet (1840–1926) was a French impressionist painter.

Monet may also refer to:

Monet (name), people with the given name and surname Monet
Fondation Monet in Giverny, nonprofit organisation
 Monet (crater), on Mercury
 Monet (submarine cable), a cable connecting Brazil and Florida
 Monet Investment Bank, Mongolian underwriting, brokerage and investment banking firm
 MonetDB, a database management system
 Monet-Goyon, French motorcycle manufacturer
 Multiwavelength optical networking, a method of digital fiber-optic communication
 Musée Marmottan Monet, French museum
 MV Monet cruise ship
 Lycée Claude-Monet, French public educational institution
 Rural Municipality of Monet No. 257, Saskatchewan, Canada
 Show Me the Monet British television series
 Smart Card Open Monet+, tennis tournament

See also
 Jean Monet (disambiguation)
 Monnet (disambiguation)
 Édouard Manet (1832–1883), French painter
 M (Marvel Comics), Monet Yvette Clarisse Maria Therese St. Croix, a character in the Marvel Comics universe